Patrick Francis Bresnahan (May 1, 1872 – January 29, 1940) was a watertender serving in the United States Navy who received the Medal of Honor for bravery.

Biography
Bresnahan was born May 1, 1872, in Peabody, Massachusetts and later joined the navy. On January 25, 1905, a boiler plate blew out from boiler D. For his actions during the explosion he received the medal March 20, 1905.

He died January 29, 1940, and is buried in Saint Marys Cemetery Salem, Massachusetts. His grave can be found in avenue 2, lot 24.

Medal of Honor citation
Rank and organization: Watertender, U.S. Navy. Born: 1 May 1872, Peabody, Mass. Accredited to: Vermont. G.O. No.: 182, 20 March 1905.

Citation:

Serving on board the U.S.S. Iowa for extraordinary heroism at the time of the blowing out of the manhole plate of boiler D on board that vessel, 25 January 1905.

See also

List of Medal of Honor recipients in non-combat incidents

References

External links

 (Requires membership)

1872 births
1940 deaths
United States Navy Medal of Honor recipients
United States Navy sailors
People from Peabody, Massachusetts
Burials in Massachusetts
Non-combat recipients of the Medal of Honor